The 2020 season was Selangor's 15th season in the Super League and their 35th consecutive season in the top flight of Malaysia football. The club also participated in the Malaysia Cup and the FA Cup.

Review

This is Selangor second season under head coach B. Sathianathan, who took permanent charge in March 2019. It is also the first season since 2018 without club captain Amri Yahyah, who left the club at the end of the 2019 season. B. Sathianathan named Taylor Regan as Amri's successor as club captain. Selangor will begin the season on 29 February 2020.

On 13 March, it was announced that the league would be suspended indefinitely, due to the ongoing COVID-19 pandemic. On 1 May, it was announced that the league would resume in September dependent on the situation at the time.  If the M-League is not allowed to resume in September, the season will be called off. Due to time constraints, the home-and-away format for the Super League and the Premier League has been scrapped. Teams will now play each other only once, meaning the champions of the Super League and Premier League will be decided after 11 rounds of matches.

On 21 September 2020, Coach B. Sathianathan have been sacked by the club, just days after their 6–1 Malaysia Super League humiliation at the hands of Johor Darul Ta'zim (JDT). Following that, the role will be filled in by the Technical Director, Michael Feichtenbeiner as interim head coach until the new head coach is announced.

On 2 October 2020, the club have made application to privatize its football team under a new entity as Selangor Football Club (Selangor FC), and was officially approved by the Football Association of Malaysia (FAM) on 29 September 2020.

Recently, the Malaysian Football League (MFL) format for the 2020 Malaysia Cup has been changed following the COVID-19 pandemic that hit the country. Group stage competitions were cancelled and replaced with 16 teams by knockout, including matches in the quarter-finals and semi-finals. On 12 November 2020, MFL confirmed that the tournament would not resume and be cancelled immediately. That mean's closes the season for Malaysian football in 2020 following government's rejection of MFL's appeal, including with large parts of the country in Conditional Movement Control Order (CMCO) due to COVID-19 pandemic.

Pre-season and friendlies
 
Selangor played a number of pre-season matches in 2020, including participating in the 2020 Asia Cup and Meizhou Hakka Cup.

 

 

 

 

 

 

 

 

2020 Asia Cup 

 

2020 Meizhou Hakka Cup

Mid-season

Squad information

First-team squad

Reserve team squad (call-up)

Other players under contract

Transfers

First transfers

Transfers in

Transfer out
 

Loan out

Competitions

Overall

Overview

Super League

Table

Results summary

Results by round

Fixtures and results

Results overview

FA Cup

Due to the COVID-19 pandemic in Malaysia, the tournament was cancelled.

Malaysia Cup

Statistics

Squad statistics
 

Appearances (Apps.) numbers are for appearances in competitive games only including sub appearances.\
Red card numbers denote: Numbers in parentheses represent red cards overturned for wrongful dismissal.

† Player left the club during the season.

Goalscorers
Includes all competitive matches.

Top assists

Clean sheets

Disciplinary record

Notes

References

Selangor FA
Selangor